Unicyclic may refer to:
 Unicyclic graph, a graph in mathematics with one cycle
 One-loop Feynman diagram, a type of pictorial representation in physics
 A cyclic compound in chemistry with one ring